Jackie Walker (born 1939) was an American popular music tenor singer of the late 1950s and early 1960s on Imperial Records. He also recorded as tenor of The Baysiders, a three-man, one woman vocal group that had been students together at UCLA.

Discography
Singles
 Love Sublime / On The Way Home Feb 10, 1957
 Wonderful One / Peggy Sue, Imperial Feb 1958
 Oh Lonesome Me / Only Teenagers Allowed, Imperial 1958
 Eternally (Wanting You, Needing You) / Good, Good Feelin´, Imperial, May 1958
 Heart Breakin' News / Take A Dream Everest 1962
 I'm Always Chasing Rainbows - backed by The Baysiders, Everest 1962 
 Dearly Beloved

References

1939 births
Living people
Place of birth missing (living people)
American tenors